ROCK TV also known as ROCKTV is a Hollywood, California based music video streaming service that first started airing in 1996 (US Copyright PAu002236428/1997-10-27) and now airs on Roku in the form or three channels, ROCKTV, ROCKTV ROCK and ROCKTV MIX. ROCK TV features videos from divisions of all of the major labels and many indies. ROCK TV is owned by ROCKTV USA, LLC.

Rock TV is an Italian music TV channel based in Milan. It is devoted to rock, alternative rock, heavy metal and punk rock, and launched in Italy on SKY Italia channel 718 in 2001. Produces also Rock Wave, a radio program on air on Rai Radio 2.
The owner is Seven Music Entertainment, owned by Gianluca Galliani, son of Adriano Galliani.

Programs 
 Rock News
 Heavy Rotation
 Italians Do It Better
 Morning Glory
 
 Zone
 Salaprove
 Rock TV Live
 My Rock TV
 On The Road
 Doctor Ringo

References

External links
 http://www.rocktv.it/ 
 Rock TV on MySpace

Music television channels
Television channels and stations established in 2001
Television channels in Italy
Italian-language television stations
Mass media in Milan
Music organisations based in Italy